Ramesa tosta is a moth of the family Notodontidae first described by Francis Walker in 1855. It is found in Sri Lanka, India, Myanmar, Java, South China, Taiwan and Japan.

Subspecies
Ramesa tosta luridivitta Hampson, 1893

References

Moths of Asia
Moths described in 1855
Notodontidae